The canoeing competition at the 1992 Summer Olympics in Barcelona was composed of 16 events (12 for men and 4 for women) in two disciplines, slalom and sprint.  The slalom events returned to the Olympic program after a 20-year absence, since the 1972 Munich Games. Slalom events took place at La Seu d'Urgell while the sprint events took place at Castelldefels.

Medal table

Medal summary

Slalom

Sprint

Men's events

Women's events

References
1992 Summer Olympics official report Volume 5. pp. 134–52. 
 

 
1992 Summer Olympics events
1992